A by-election was held in the Legislative Assembly of Queensland seat of Lytton on 5 October 1996. It was triggered by the resignation of sitting Labor member Tom Burns. The by-election was won by Labor candidate Paul Lucas.

Result

See also
List of Queensland state by-elections

References
1998 Election results (includes previous term's by-elections)

1996 elections in Australia
Queensland state by-elections
1990s in Queensland